The InterPlane Starboy was a proposed Czech homebuilt aircraft designed by InterPlane Aircraft of Zbraslavice. The aircraft was intended to be supplied as a complete ready-to-fly-aircraft or as a kit for amateur construction, but none seem to have been built.

Design and development
The Starboy design featured a cantilever low-wing, a two-seats-in-side-by-side configuration enclosed cockpit under a bubble canopy, fixed tricycle landing gear with wheel pants and a single engine in tractor configuration.

The aircraft was to have been constructed of a combination of aluminum and composite materials. The standard engine proposed was the  Rotax 912UL.

With full fuel of  the payload for pilot, passenger and baggage would have been .

The manufacturer estimated the construction time from the planned kit as 500 hours.

Specifications (Starboy)

References

Starboy
1990s Czech and Czechoslovakian sport aircraft
1990s Czech and Czechoslovakian ultralight aircraft
1990s Czech and Czechoslovakian civil utility aircraft
Single-engined tractor aircraft
Low-wing aircraft
Homebuilt aircraft